"In the End" is a song by Swiss recording artist Stefanie Heinzmann. It was written by Heinzmann along with Edvard Førre Erfjord, Henrik Barman Michelsen, and Sam Romans for her fourth studio album Chance of Rain (2015), with production helmed by Erfjord and Michelsen under their production moniker Electric. Selected as the album's first single, "In the End" peaked at number nine on the Swiss Albums Chart, becoming Heinzmann's third domestic top ten hit, and reached the top thirty in Germany.

Charts

Weekly charts

References

External links
  
 

2015 singles
2015 songs
Stefanie Heinzmann songs
Songs written by Romans (musician)
Songs written by Henrik Barman Michelsen
Songs written by Edvard Forre Erfjord